The 1875 Atlantic hurricane season featured three landfalling tropical cyclones. However, in the absence of modern satellite and other remote-sensing technologies, only storms that affected populated land areas or encountered ships at sea were recorded, so the actual total could be higher. An undercount bias of zero to six tropical cyclones per year between 1851 and 1885 has been estimated. There were five recorded hurricanes and one major hurricane – Category 3 or higher on the modern-day Saffir–Simpson scale.

Reanalysis of the season for HURDAT – the official database for Atlantic tropical cyclones – was completed by 2011. Of the known 1875 cyclones, both the first and fifth cyclones were first documented in 1995 by Jose Fernandez-Partagas and Henry Diaz. They also proposed large changes to the known track of the sixth system and to the duration of the second storm, as well as more minor changes to the track of third cyclone. The duration of the second system was further amended in 2008.

Although three tropical cyclones made landfall, only one caused significant damage. The season's third known and strongest system, known as the Indianola hurricane, brought devastation to portions of the Lesser Antilles, Greater Antilles, and Texas. It is estimated that the hurricane caused about 800 fatalities, with approximately 300 in the city of Indianola, Texas, alone. The storm left over $5 million (1875 USD) in damage.


Timeline

Systems

Hurricane One 

Due to sparsity of data, HURDAT indicates that the cyclone maintained intensity as an 80 mph (130 km/h) Category 1 hurricane on the modern day Saffir–Simpson scale, as it tracked north-northeastward to northeastward. The hurricane was last noted offshore Nova Scotia by the bark Electra late on August 19.

Hurricane Two 

On September 3, the Spanish brig Engracia became the first ship to encounter the storm. That day, the cyclone intensified into a Category 1 hurricane while moving northwestward. On September 7, the cyclone began moving northward and then northeastward later that day.

Hurricane Three 

The storm was first observed on September 1 to the southwest of Cabo Verde by the ship Tautallon Castle. However, HURDAT does not indicate a tropical cyclone until the system was situated east of Barbados on September 8. The hurricane moved westward and passed between Martinique and St. Lucia on the following day. The hurricane slowly deepened in the Caribbean Sea while gradually curving northwestward. Late on September 12 and early on September 13, the cyclone brushed the Tiburon Peninsula of Haiti. On September 13, the storm made a few landfalls on the southern coast of Cuba before moving inland over Sancti Spíritus Province. The system emerged into the Gulf of Mexico near Havana and briefly weakened to a tropical storm. Thereafter, the storm slowly re-intensified and gradually turned westward. At 12:00 UTC on September 16, the hurricane became a Category 3 hurricane with winds peaking at 115 mph (185 km/h), based on land observations. Seven hours later, the hurricane made landfall near Indianola, Texas. The storm quickly weakened and turned northeastward, before dissipating over Mississippi on September 18.

The hurricane brought heavy rainfall to several islands of the Lesser Antilles, especially Saint Vincent. Flooding and landslides caused severe damage to crops and roads. Outside the capital city, water swept away more than 30 homes in total from Hopewell and Mesopotamia. Four people drowned in the latter, with five other fatalities in Queensbury. In Martinique, 20 deaths occurred after the ship Codfish sank in the harbor. Navassa Island experienced strong winds, heavy rainfall, and waves that topped the  cliffs. Many trees were downed and several homes were destroyed. Strong winds and above normal tides in Cuba left damage across the island, especially in Júcaro and Santa Cruz del Sur. In Texas, Old Velasco was completely leveled, while the town of Indianola was nearly destroyed. Three-quarters of the buildings in Indianola were washed away and the remaining structures were in a state of ruin, with only eight buildings left undamaged. Approximately 300 people were killed in Indianola. The town was again almost completely destroyed by another hurricane in 1886 and subsequently abandoned. Four people drowned after the two lighthouses at Pass Cavallo were swept away. At Galveston, several houses and a railroad bridge were destroyed, and a ship, the Beardstown sunk in Galveston Bay. The town suffered about $4 million in damage and 30 deaths. Overall, the hurricane left an estimated 800 deaths.

Tropical Storm Four 

A tropical storm formed in the west-central Gulf of Mexico on September 24. After initially moving northwestward, the storm curved east-northeastward by the following day. The cyclone peaked with maximum sustained winds of 60 mph (95 km/h), and due to lack of data, was believed to have maintained this intensity until making landfall near modern-day Panama City, Florida at 13:00 UTC on September 27. By early September 28, the storm weakened to a tropical depression and soon dissipated near the Florida–Georgia state line.

Hurricane Five 

The schooner Pilot's Pride first encountered this hurricane northeast of the Bahamas on October 7. The system moved just west of due north and intensified into a Category 2 hurricane on the following day. Based on ship reports, the hurricane is estimated to have peaked with maximum sustained winds of 105 mph (165 km/h). The bark Marie was damaged by the storm on October 8 and returned to port for repairs. Early on October 9, the cyclone curved northeastward and weakened to a Category 1 hurricane. The storm was last noted to the southeast of Sable Island late on October 10.

Hurricane Six 

Moving slowly northward to north-northeastward, the storm slowly strengthened, reaching hurricane intensity on October 14. The system peaked with maximum sustained winds of 80 mph (130 km/h), based on observations from the ship E.E. Ruckett. The cyclone weakened to a tropical storm early on October 15 and began accelerating northeastward. Early October 16, the storm made landfall near Yarmouth, Nova Scotia, with winds of 60 mph (95 km/h), shortly before transitioning into an extratropical cyclone. Several locations along the East Coast of the United States reported heavy rainfall.

See also 

 Tropical cyclone observation
 Atlantic hurricane reanalysis project
 History of Atlantic hurricane warnings

References

External links 
 HURDAT Data for the 1875 Atlantic hurricane season

 
Articles which contain graphical timelines
Atlantic
Atlantic
Atlantic hurricane seasons